Onyx: Black Lesbian Newsletter was a bimonthly magazine focusing on Black Lesbian life and culture. Originally titled Black Lesbian Newsletter, Onyx: Black Lesbian Newsletter was published in the San Francisco Bay Area from 1982 to 1984. The newsletter contained articles, poems, personal adds and original art and photographs. Onyx is notable for being the earliest of three Bay Area publications including Ache and Issues which focused on Black Lesbian life and culture, the longest running of which was Ache: A Journal for Lesbians of African Descent which was published from 1989 to 1993. Onyx covers were illustrated by Sarita Johnson.

See also

 List of lesbian periodicals
 List of lesbian periodicals in the United States
 Black lesbian literature in the United States

References

Further reading

 Smith, Michael J. (1983). "Colorful people and places: a resource guide for Third World lesbians and gay men, and for white people who share their interests". Quarterly Press of BWMT. p. 27. 

 Oxbridge Directory of Newsletters. (1991). United States: Oxbridge Communications.

External links

 Black Lesbian Newsletter / Onyx Collection at the Online Archive of California

Mass media in Berkeley, California
Feminism in the United States
Feminist magazines
Lesbian culture in California
Lesbian feminist mass media
Lesbian history in the United States
Lesbian-related magazines
Lesbian separatism
LGBT African-American culture
LGBT culture in the San Francisco Bay Area
LGBT-related magazines published in the United States
Magazines established in 1982
Magazines published in San Francisco
Monthly magazines published in the United States
Women's magazines published in the United States
1982 in LGBT history